Högsta förvaltningsdomstolen is the official name in Swedish for

Supreme Administrative Court of Finland
Supreme Administrative Court of Sweden